Chlormadinone is a progestin which was never marketed. An acylated derivative, chlormadinone acetate, is used clinically as a pharmaceutical drug.

It was patented in 1958 and approved for medical use in 1963. While chlormadinone is sometimes used as a synonym for chlormadinone acetate, what is almost always being referred to is chlormadinone acetate and not chlormadinone.

See also
 List of progestogens

References

Abandoned drugs
Enones
Chloroarenes
Conjugated dienes
Diketones
Pregnanes
Progestogens
Tertiary alcohols